Wijay or Vijay (Tamil ; born December 29, 1982, in Medan, North Sumatra) is an Indonesian footballer midfielder of Indian descent. Previously, he played for Persita Tangerang in the 2014 Indonesia Super League.

Honours

Clubs
Sriwijaya FC :
Liga Indonesia Premier Division champions : 1 (2007)
Piala Indonesia champions : 2 (2007–08, 2008–09)

References

External links

1982 births
Association football midfielders
Living people
Sportspeople from Medan
Indonesian people of Indian descent
Indonesian people of Tamil descent
Indonesian footballers
Indonesia international footballers
Liga 1 (Indonesia) players
Mitra Kukar players
People from Medan
Persebaya Surabaya players
Sriwijaya F.C. players
Indonesian Premier Division players
PSMS Medan players